Al-Bireh, El Bire, Biré, El Bireh (Arabic: البيرة) or Birra (time of Crusades) is a town in the Rashaya District, south-eastern portion of the Bekaa Governorate of the Republic of Lebanon. Al-Bireh is part of the Rashaya municipal district. It lies west of the road between Majdel Anjar and Rashaya. Its population is estimated to be 9000. It is a small Muslim town with two mosques and two schools.

Geography
The oldest part of the town lies on top of Jabal Arbi Mountains while the newer parts lie in the Wadi al-Taym valley and is referred to as Izza. Neighboring towns include Rafid, Kamed, Khirbet-Rouha, and Mdouckha. The town is located about 80 km from Beirut and 40 km from Damascus, Syria. From Al-Bireh, Jabal -Al-Sheikh (Mount Hermon) can be seen with its majestic snow-capped peak.

Economy
More than 60% of the town’s population have emigrated to Brazil, Argentina, United States, Canada, France, Spain, Italy and Portugal. Residents of the town have left to the US as early as the 18th Century and have aggregated in cities like Dearborn, Michigan. Many others emigrated to São Paulo, Brazil; Buenos Aires, Argentina; Montreal, Quebec and Calgary, Alberta, Canada.

The economy of the town relies on agriculture which thrived on the water springs commonly found in Al-Bireh.  The town is known for growing olives, almonds, fruits and vegetables and a variety of crops.  However, the severe emigration has reduced the agriculture activities over the past three decades.

Eight main families inhabit the town, namely the Elkadri, Jeha (جحا), Jumaa, Abou Hussein, Zeineddine, Abdallah, Salem and Omar families.  Other families also live in the village, however increased emigration has completely dispersed some families and no members are currently residents.

Notable residents

Al-Bireh is the birthplace of multiple intellectuals, politicians and religious figures.  The late Nazem Elkadri (MP, minister and prime minister of Lebanon) was born in Al-Bireh. The Mufti of Bekaa, Sheikh Raouf Elkadri was also born in Al-Bireh. Nassouh Elkadri (an anti-French occupation revolutionary leader) was also from Al-Bireh.

History
The mountain chain upon which Al-Bireh is located is rich with history.  Caves dating back to pre-historic times can be found all over the mountain.  Ruins of other more modern civilizations are still very visible.  The locals usually come across artifacts dating back to Phoenician, Byzantine, Roman and Canaanite eras.  Many artifacts and archaeological pieces were illegally excavated out of the caves and burial grounds during the Lebanese Civil War and the Israeli occupation, however it is hoped that one day, area will be declared a UNESCO World Heritage Site, thus protecting one of the most important areas of human cultural heritage on Earth.

In 1838, Eli Smith noted el-Bireh as a Sunni Muslim village in the Beqaa Valley.

The town was occupied first by PLO forces in the late 1970s, then by Israeli forces in the early 1980s. Before Israel's invasion, the town suffered from Israeli warplane attacks. In one incident, several houses were bombed, killing and injuring scores of civilians .  Israel did not provide explanation as to why these were bombed.

Archaeology
A Heavy Neolithic archaeological site of the Qaraoun culture was discovered by Auguste Bergy along a south to west track that lead from the road to a small spring. Bergy originally suggested it was a "Chellean factory site" before the Heavy Neolithic was defined by Henri Fleisch. Lorraine Copeland agreed that it was probably a factory, noting several prepared flakes and a large Neolithic pick. The material is now held in the archives of the Saint Joseph University.

Media
Al-Bireh was the site where the French/Lebanese movie Le Cerf-Volant (The Kite) (Tayyara min waraq) was filmed.

In January 2009 a street in town was named after president Hugo Chávez, after Venezuela expelled an Israeli ambassador due IDF attack in Gaza Strip.

In the Lebanese Parliamentary elections of June 2009, Ziad Nazem Elkadri, son of the late Nazim Elkadri, won his seat running with the Future Movement in the March 14 coalition list.  Ziad is the second MP to be elected from the village, the first being his father.

Gallery

References

Bibliography

External links
 Map of El Bire on www.discoverlebanon.com
Bireh (Rachaiya), Localiban

Populated places in Rashaya District
Sunni Muslim communities in Lebanon

Great Rift Valley
Archaeological sites in Lebanon
Beqaa Valley
Heavy Neolithic sites